I-41 was an Imperial Japanese Navy B2 type submarine.  She was completed at Kure Navy Yard on 18 September 1943, whereupon she entered into service with the Imperial Japanese Navy Yokosuka Naval District, SubRon 11, and sailed to Yokosuka for final trials under the command of Lt. Commander Tamori Yoshimatsu.  This was completed by 15 December 1943 and command was transferred to Lt. Commander Itakura Mitsuma.  I-41 was reassigned to the Sixth Fleet in SubRon 1's Sub Division 15.

World War II service

Supply submarine
On 29 December 1943 the new submarine departed Tokosuka for Truk. Arriving at Truk on New Years Day 1944, her deck gun and all of her torpedoes were taken on shore to prepare the sub for a supply mission. Nine days later I-41 was designated as the flagship of SubDiv 15. On 15 January 1943 I-41 sailed from Truk for Rabaul. While en route, SubRon1 was disbanded and the submarine was attached directly to the Sixth Fleet Headquarters. She docked at Rabaul on 19 January 1944, loaded supplies, and left four days later on her first supply run to Sarmi, New Guinea. I-41 arrived at Sarmi on 25 January and unloaded, departing immediately to return to Rabaul. She arrived there on 27 January. Heading to sea again on 31 January the submarine made for Bougainville Island. After evading minefields and enemy patrols she arrived at Buin, unloaded on 4 February, and returned to Rabaul on 7 February. Between 12 February and 24 February she made another supply run to Buin, tying up at Rabaul once again before setting out for Truk on 27 February carrying 98 naval pilots and staff officers as passengers, including the commanding officer of the 501st Naval Air Group. She arrived safely at Truk on 2 March and discharged her passengers. She sailed on 7 March toward Rabaul, but was recalled to Truk on the 9th.

After a week's respite I-41 sailed for Rabaul once again on 15 March. While en route, on March 19, I-41 was running surfaced north of Rabaul when she was attacked by two torpedoes from an unknown enemy submarine. The lookouts saw the "fish" in time and Lt. Commander Itakura was able to evade the attack by turning sharply to port; the nearest torpedo passed 55 yards ahead of the submarine. Upon arrival at Rabaul the next day she was reassigned to SubRon 7.

USN Fleet Radio Unit Melbourne (FRUMEL) intercepted and decoded a message the same day indicating that I-41 was expected to leave Rabaul at 0300 on 21st, pass through 3-08S, 149-21E at 0200 on 23rd, and arrive Truk at 1330 on 25th. This was accurate information. The sub left at the appointed time transporting 98 passengers including the CO of SubRon 7, Rear Admiral Owada Noboru, his staff, and a number of airmen. While she was en route FRUMEL intercepted another message reading, "Expect submarine I-41 to arrive South Channel about 0900 tomorrow 25th." This was also accurate. Despite this, the submarine was not attacked and arrived safely at Truk on 25 March. She was escorted in through the south channel by Kinpo Maru No. 1.

Operation Tatsumaki
In April 1944, I-41 was selected as one of several submarines to participate in an amphibious assault on Majuro in the Marshall Islands. She was ordered to train with I-36, I-38, I-44, and I-53 for this attack, which called for the submarines to carry amphibious tanks armed with torpedoes from Kure to Majuro. Once there they would be put ashore, make their way overland, and enter the water again to attack ships in harbor there. The plan was cancelled before it could be realized, however.

Return to supply duty
With the cancellation of Operation Tatsumaki, I-41 returned to her previous duties as a supply sub. She left Truk on 1 April 1944, making her third run to Buin with 50 tons of food. She arrived on 7 April, unloaded, embarked 73 passengers, and returned to Truk. I-41 docked at Truk on 13 April. Her deck gun was remounted during her layover in Truk Lagoon. For his successful supply runs, Lt. Commander Itakura is given a gift of cigarettes from Vice Admiral Takagi Takeo, the CINC of the Sixth Fleet. On 19 April the sub departed Truk for Yokosuka, where she arrived on the 25th. She was then transferred to Kure.

First War patrol
After needed upkeep, I-41 departed Kure to patrol between the Admiralty Islands and Wewak, New Guinea, on 15 May 1944. No targets were sighted, but while still on patrol 13 June word was received by Admiral Toyoda Soemu, CINC, Combined Fleet, that the American anchorage at Marujo was empty. The admiral ordered Vice Admiral Takagi to redeploy his boats, I-41 among them, toward the Marianas. I-41 received the order the next day, being dispatched to a region South of Guam at best possible speed.

On 15 June 1944 the American invasion of Saipan started. As a result, communication with Vice Admiral Takagi Takeo and Sixth Fleet Command was disrupted and command of sixth fleet submarines passed to Rear Admiral Owada Noboru of SubRon 7 at Truk. In his final message sent from the island, Takagi announced he and his staff were planning to join a banzai charge imminently. He was promoted to Admiral, posthumously.

On 22 June 1944, I-41 was detached from her group and ordered to Guam to evacuate naval aviators stranded there. She arrived two days later and surveyed the island from periscope depth in search of a suitable embarkation point. After sunset she surfaced 1,100 yards offshore and contacted units on land. Two barges managed to transfer a total of 106 pilots (mostly from the 705th Naval Air Group) before an approaching patrol bomber (a Consolidated B-24 Liberator) forced the submarine to dive. Further embarkation was aborted. The submarine and her passengers returned to Ōita on Kyushu, landing there on 30 June 1944.

Beginning 1 July, the submarine arrived at Kure and commenced battle training.

Second War patrol
On 13 October Operation Sho-I-Go (Defense of the Philippines) was ordered. Six days later I-41 departed Kure to patrol east of the Philippines. The next day an American fleet of 738 ships landed on Leyte, precipitating an order to I-41 to proceed at flank speed to a patrol area east of Leyte. I-41 reported sinking an American transport on 27 October, but there is no corroborating loss on the American side.

On 30 October the submarine reported sighting a task force with three aircraft carriers 220 miles east by northeast of Suluan Island but was not able to engage. A few days later, on 3 November, I-41s lookouts sighted what they believed was an aircraft carrier near the San Bernardino Strait, in the company of other ships. At 2330 hours Lt. Commander Kondo set up his shot and fired a salvo of torpedoes at the target. One of these hit the light cruiser  in the port side. Kondo reported sinking a carrier, but in fact no hits were scored on any carrier and Reno did not sink, later being towed to Ulithi by the tug . A Yokosuka P1Y "Frances" attack bomber "confirmed" Lt. Commander Kondo's claim and he was awarded a special citation from Emperor Hirohito.

On 12 November 1944 Lt. Commander Kondo reported attacking another task force. This communication was the last word received from I-41.

Loss
East of Samar on 18 November 1944 during an ASW patrol in the Philippine Sea, Task Group 30.7's  was alerted to the presence of a Japanese submarine in her operating area by an "Ultra" signals-intelligence message. Anzios aircraft conducted an ASW sweep. One of the aircraft reported a radar contact on a submarine on the surface. There were no survivors. Overdue from patrol, I-41 was presumed lost with all hands on 2 December 1944 and removed from the Navy List on 10 March 1945.

Notes

Sources
 Hackett, Bob & Kingsepp, Sander.  HIJMS Submarine I-41: Tabular Record of Movement.  http://www.combinedfleet.com/I-41.htm.  Retrieved on July 23, 2014.

Type B2 submarines
Ships built by Kure Naval Arsenal
1943 ships
World War II submarines of Japan
Japanese submarines lost during World War II
Ships sunk by US aircraft
Submarines sunk by United States warships
Ships lost with all hands
Maritime incidents in November 1944
Submarines sunk by aircraft